is a railway station in Kurashiki, Okayama Prefecture, Japan.

Lines
West Japan Railway Company
Uno Line
Honshi-Bisan Line

Station Layout
Chayamachi Station has 2 island platforms that serve 3 tracks.

Adjacent stations

Railway stations in Okayama Prefecture